Hornibrook Bus Lines is an Australian operator of bus services in the Redcliffe Peninsula and surrounding Upper Bayside area of Brisbane. It operates 16 services under contract to the Queensland Government under the Translink banner.

History
In August 1935 Hornibrook Highway Bus Service commenced operating a service from Redcliffe to Sandgate station.

In 1975 Hornibrook Bus Lines was purchased by Geoff Mountjoy. By the late 1980s it had purchased Redcliffe-Brisbane Bus Service and Sandgate-Lutwyche Bus Service.

In 1998 South Western Suburban Transit was purchased.

Routes

Fleet
As at December 2022, the fleet consisted of 64 buses.

Depots
Depots are operated in Clontarf and North Lakes.

References

External links
Translink timetables

Bus companies of Queensland
Keolis
Public transport in Brisbane
Translink (Queensland)
1935 establishments in Australia